Taran Kozun (born August 29, 1994) is a Canadian professional ice hockey goaltender. He is currently playing with the Cardiff Devils in the UK's Elite Ice Hockey League (EIHL).

Playing career
During the 2014–15 WHL season while playing with the Seattle Thunderbirds, Kozun was awarded the Del Wilson Trophy as the WHL's top goaltender and was named to the WHL Western Conference First All-Star Team.

After three seasons playing with Canadian University hockey with the Saskatchewan Huskies, claiming back-to-back U Sports Goaltender of the Year accolades, Kozun returned to the professional circuit in the ECHL, joining the Kansas City Mavericks on October 28, 2020. After 1 game stints with the Mavericks, Indy Fuel and Rapid City Rush, Kozun was traded by the Rush to join his brother, Tad, at the Orlando Solar Bears on February 10, 2021.

In July 2021, Kozun agreed terms to join the EIHL side Cardiff Devils for the 2021–22 season.

Awards and honours

References

External links

1994 births
Living people
Allen Americans players
Canadian ice hockey goaltenders
Cardiff Devils players
Indy Fuel players
Kamloops Blazers players
Kansas City Mavericks players
Nipawin Hawks players
Orlando Solar Bears (ECHL) players
Pensacola Ice Flyers players
Rapid City Rush players
Saskatchewan Huskies players
Seattle Thunderbirds players
Utah Grizzlies (ECHL) players
Wheeling Nailers players
Canadian expatriate ice hockey players in Wales